The Belgrade bypass or Belgrade city road bypass is a U-shaped, 69-km long motorway partially encircling the city of Belgrade, the capital of Serbia. Some 9.6  km of the bypass is the section of A1 motorway (currently under construction), and the rest is planned eastern extension of A3.

The construction of the bypass started in 1990 and its parts have been sporadically built ever since. Its completion is expected to help alleviate Belgrade's traffic congestion, and remove all transit traffic from the city itself.

Route
Sector A (Batajnica - Dobanovci, A3 interchange)
Sector A is 11.1 km long part of A1  motorway that intersects with A3 motorway at Dobanovci interchange. It is completed and opened to traffic in 2012.

Sector B (Dobanovci, A3 interchange – Bubanj Potok) 
Sector B is 37.2 km long part of A1 motorway that intersects with A2 motorway at Surčin interchange. 
It is currently under construction, with some 27.6 km fully in service, the final 9.6 km still under construction. It spans the hilly terrain to the south of Belgrade, and will eventually include 4 tunnels and 40 viaducts when completed, nine of them over 400 m long, with dual carriageway Ostružnica bridge across the Sava.

It is divided in 6 sections:

Section B1: Dobanovci interchange – Surčin. It includes Surčin interchange and the Surčin South interchange with the A2 highway. The right carriageway of this 7.8 km long sector was opened in 2005, while the left was opened in 2016.

Section B2: Surčin – Ostružnica Bridge. The right carriageway of this 4.9 km long section was opened in 2005, while the left was opened in 2016.

Section B3:  Ostružnica Bridge – Ostružnica. This 4.1 km long section includes 1950 meters long Ostružnica Bridge over the Sava river and Ostružnica interchange with road 26 for Belgrade center and Obrenovac. The right carriageway was opened in 2005, while the left one was opened in June 2020.

Section B4: Ostružnica – Orlovača. On this 7.7 kilometer stretch are tunnels Lipak (665 m) and Železnik (699 m), as well as Orlovača interchange with road 22 for Belgrade center and Čačak. Only the right carriageway was constructed in 2008, while the left one was opened in April 2021.

Section B5: Orlovača – tunnel Straževica. It includes tunnel "Straževica", the longest one on Sector B (772 m). Only 3.1 km of the right carriageway was constructed in 2012. The left one was opened on June 15, 2022.

Section B6: Tunel "Straževica" – Bubanj Potok. Construction of this 9.6 km long section is undergoing (as of 2022). It includes tunnel "Beli Potok" (360 m) and the Avala interchange. Along with the section B, it ends at the existing interchange Bubanj Potok, with the connecting roads being built.

Sector C (Bubanj Potok - Pančevo) 

Sector C is planned 21 km long eastern prolongation of A3 motorway (which itself will connect Belgrade with Pančevo and Vršac and eventually Romania at border crossing near Vatin). This is the most complex sector of the bypass, as its construction involves building a  bridge over the Danube, and additional 11 viaducts and 2 tunnels. Its exact route is not decided yet, nor the start of the construction.

References

External links
 Beobuild.rs – news, discussions and photos of the bypass

Transport in Belgrade
Transport in Serbia
Motorways in Serbia
Ring roads
Bypasses